Harlan Henthorne Hatcher (September 9, 1898 – February 25, 1998) served as the eighth President of the University of Michigan from 1951 to 1967.

Biography
Harlan Henthorne Hatcher was born on September 9, 1898, in Ironton, Ohio. He received a B.A., an M.A. and a Ph.D. from Ohio State University. He also attended the University of Chicago as a graduate student.

He worked as a Professor of American Literature at Ohio State University, then as Dean of the College of Arts and Sciences in 1944, and as Vice President in 1948. In 1951, he became the eighth President of the University of Michigan. He helped expand the budget from $44.5 million to more than $186 million, and enrollment from 17,000 to 37,000. He also established additional campuses in Flint and Dearborn. In 1954, he condoned the hearings of the House Un-American Activities Committee and fired two faculty members for suspicions of Communism. He stepped down in 1967. In 1968, the Graduate Library was named after him. He wrote three novels and several academic volumes.

Bibliography
Tunnel Hill (Bobbs-Merrill, 1931)
Patterns of Wolfpen (Johns Creek, Pike County, Kentucky) (Bobbs Merrill, 1934)
Creating the Modern American Novel (1935)
The Buckeye Country: A Pageant of Ohio (1940)
The Ohio Guide (1940, editor)
Modern American Dramas (1941)
"The Great Lakes" (Oxford University Press, 1944)
Lake Erie (1945)
A Century of Iron and Men (1950)
A Modern Repertory (1953)
Johnny Appleseed: A Voice in the Wilderness, The Story of the Pioneer John Chapman (1953)
A Pictorial History of the Great Lakes (1963)
Versification of Robert Browning (1969)
The Western Reserve: The Story of New Connecticut in Ohio

References

1898 births
1998 deaths
People from Ironton, Ohio
20th-century American novelists
American male novelists
Ohio State University alumni
University of Chicago alumni
Ohio State University faculty
Presidents of the University of Michigan
Novelists from Ohio
20th-century American male writers
20th-century American academics